Lucius Quintius Cincinnatus Elmer (February 3, 1793 – March 11, 1883) was an American Democratic Party politician who represented New Jersey's 1st congressional district in the U.S. Congress from 1843 to 1845. He was son of Ebenezer Elmer and nephew of Jonathan Elmer, both of whom also served in Congress.

Biography
Elmer was born in Bridgeton, New Jersey on February 3, 1793. He attended the private schools and graduated from the University of Pennsylvania. During the War of 1812, he served in the militia as a lieutenant of artillery, and was promoted to the rank of brigade major and inspector. He studied law, was admitted to the bar in 1815 and commenced practice in Bridgeton. He was prosecuting attorney for the State in 1824. He was a member of the New Jersey General Assembly from 1820–1823, serving the last year as speaker. He was prosecutor of the pleas for Cumberland County in 1824 and U.S. Attorney for the District of New Jersey from 1824-1829.

Elmer was elected in 1843 as a Democrat to the Twenty-eighth Congress in a district which comprises Atlantic, Cape May, Cumberland, Gloucester and Salem Counties (Camden County was created out of Gloucester in 1844), serving in office from March 4, 1843 – March 3, 1845, where he served as chairman of the Committee on Elections. He was an unsuccessful for reelection in 1844 to the Twenty-ninth Congress. As a lame-duck Congressman, Elmer was the lone New Jersey Democratic vote against the annexation of Texas in January 1845.

After leaving Congress, he served as New Jersey Attorney General of New Jersey from 1850–1852, and was an associate justice of the New Jersey Supreme Court from 1852 to 1859 and again from 1861 until 1869 when he retired. He died in Bridgeton on March 11, 1883, and was interred in Old Broad Street Presbyterian Church Cemetery in Bridgeton.

Elmer married Catharine Hay on 6 October 1818 in Philadelphia. Catharine Hay, daughter of Daniel Hay and Catharine Ferrier, was born in 1794 in Philadelphia, Pennsylvania and died on 27 October 1884 in Bridgeton, New Jersey at age 90, and was interred on 30 October 1884 in Old Broad Street Presbyterian Church Cemetery in Bridgeton, New Jersey.

Legacy
The Borough of Elmer in Salem County, New Jersey was named in his honor. Elmer helped obtain a post office for the community during his service as Congressman.

References

External links

Lucius Quintius Cincinnatus Elmer at The Political Graveyard

1793 births
1883 deaths
People from Bridgeton, New Jersey
American people of English descent
Democratic Party members of the United States House of Representatives from New Jersey
New Jersey Attorneys General
Politicians from Cumberland County, New Jersey
Speakers of the New Jersey General Assembly
Democratic Party members of the New Jersey General Assembly
Justices of the Supreme Court of New Jersey
United States Attorneys for the District of New Jersey
University of Pennsylvania alumni
Burials in New Jersey
19th-century American politicians
19th-century American judges